Bărcănești is a commune located in Ialomița County, Muntenia, Romania. It is composed of two villages, Bărcănești and Condeești.

References

Communes in Ialomița County
Localities in Muntenia